Climpson is a surname of English origin. Notable people with the surname include:

 Mary Janet Climpson (died 1940), British Salvation Army officer interred in Dieppe Canadian War Cemetery
 Roger Climpson (born 1931), British-born Australian journalist, newsreader and television presenter

Fictional characters
 Miss Katharine Climpson, fictional character, elderly spinster, colleague of Lord Peter Wimsey in several detective novels by Dorothy L. Sayers

See also 
 Clemson (disambiguation)